is a racing video game released by Sega for the Master System in 1986. The player drives a Formula One style car as quickly as possible while navigating through turns and other vehicles on the road. A formal scoring system is not used; players are not ranked by position unlike most racing games. This kind of timekeeping would not be used in a subsequent video game until the release of the Taito Grand Prix: Eikō e no License on the Family Computer the following year.

Reception
Computer and Video Games magazine rated the game 81% in 1989.

References

External links

1986 video games
Formula One video games
Sega video games
Master System games
Master System-only games
Video games developed in Japan